Magdalena Majewska (born 27 July 1963 in Pabianice) is a Polish journalist.

Since 1987 she works for TVP Łódź.

References

1963 births
Living people
Polish women journalists
People from Pabianice
20th-century Polish women